Joseph Dodds can refer to:
Joseph Dodds (British politician), 1819-1891
Joe Dodds (Scottish footballer), 1887-1965